Stig Winter (1 March 1929 – 26 January 2010) was a Finnish rower. He competed in the men's coxless pair event at the 1952 Summer Olympics.

References

1929 births
2010 deaths
Finnish male rowers
Olympic rowers of Finland
Rowers at the 1952 Summer Olympics
Sportspeople from Turku